Ashley & JaQuavis is the pseudonym of American writing street lit duo and New York Times best selling authors Ashley Antoinette and JaQuavis Coleman. They are considered the youngest African-American co-authors to place on the New York Times Best Seller list twice. Their best-known work is the Cartel series, which appeared on the list in 2009 and 2010.

Biography
Ashley Antoinette Snell (b. 1985) and JaQuavis Coleman (c. 1984) were both born in Flint, Michigan. Coleman was raised in foster homes after being removed from his mother's home at age eight and eventually graduated from Flint Central High School; Antoinette graduated from Hamady High School. Coleman began selling cocaine at age 12. The couple met following an attempted drug bust, during which Coleman, then 16, realized he was selling to an undercover cop. He fled, eventually throwing the drugs into a bush off an alleyway. When the cops caught up with him, they were unable to locate the drugs in the bushes or on his person and were forced to let him go. Within days, Antoinette got in contact with Coleman to tell him she had seen him running from her window and dug the drugs out of the bushes to hide in her basement before the cops caught up. They were both avid readers and became close very quickly. Antoinette was pregnant within a year and the two moved in together while still attending high school. In the second month of pregnancy, Antoinette was forced to end what had become an ectopic pregnancy, which sent Antoinette into a deep depression. One day, Coleman told her: "I bet I could write a better book than you." Antoinette, who was very competitive, agreed; within days, they combined their works into Dirty Money, their first novel. The pair attended Ferris State University for two semesters, during which Coleman continued to sell cocaine in Flint.

Career
At 18, they landed their first publishing deal by selling the Dirty Money manuscript to Carl Weber's Kensington Publishing imprint, which focused on street lit. In her excitement, Antoinette flushed the rest of Coleman's cocaine stash, which he claims was worth $40,000, despite their advance being for only $4,000. They dropped out of Ferris State and moved to New York to pursue writing. Antoinette and Coleman's books are based primarily by their lives in impoverished Flint, Michigan. They initially sold free advance copies they received from their publisher from the trunk of their car but quickly became prolific authors in the street lit genre, publishing four or five books annually. By 2009, their book Tale of the Murda Mamas, the second installment of their Cartel series, appeared on the New York Times Best Seller list.

In 2012, Diamonds Are Forever, Cartel book four, was also featured on the New York Times Best Seller list, and Coleman and Antonette were recognized as #27 of Ebony's Power 100, a list that also featured the Obamas, Oprah, Beyoncé and Jay-Z, and Trayvon Martin. They were nominated separately for Street Lit Writer of the Year by the African Americans on the Move Book Club (AAMBC); JaQuavis was also nominated for Male Author of the Year. In 2013, they started their own company, the Official Writers League, which publishes authors such as Keishar Tyree, C.N. Phillips, and Ameleka McCall. Antoinette signed a contract with Viacom to write several novelas about the main characters from the show Single Ladies on VH1. She was also nominated as the Female Author of the Year by the AAMBC. Antoinette received two more nominations by the AAMBC in 2014 (Reader's Choice Awards) and 2016 (Street Lit Writer of the Year).

The pair was awarded with the Urban Classic Honor at the 2018 AAMBC Awards; the following year, Antoinette's Ethic series was named the Best Black Book Series and she was named Author Queen of the Year by Black Girls Who Write (BGWW), while Coleman was named Author King of the Year. In 2020, Antoinette won her first AAMBC awards: Urban Book of the Year for the sixth installment of her Ethics series and Street Lit Writer of the Year. She and Coleman were awarded the Best Black Collaborative Series by BGWW. Antoinette and the couple's 10-year old son Quaye co-wrote The Girl Behind the Wall, published in 2020 by Ashley Antoinette Inc.

Many of their books, including Kiss Kiss, Bang Bang, Diamonds Are Forever, and The Demise, are banned in American prisons for being sexually explicit or for having criminal activity.

Film
In addition to writing, JaQuavis is also a film producer and director. In 2012, he directed Hard 6ix, based on their novel Kiss Kiss, Bang Bang, and starring Tone Trump, Ashley Antoinette, and Tiffany Marshall. In 2013, he directed 1000's "Life of a DopeBoy" music video and worked production on a film with Sean Lott. He was also working with HBO on the pilot of a television show. In 2015, he wrote and directed White House: The Movie based on his novel The White House. In 2021, Coleman worked as executive producer, writer, and director of the film Everything is Both, co-produced by Ekpe Udoh and starring Barton Fitzpatrick, Stakiah Washington, and Jason Mitchell. The film is based on a short story by Coleman.

Antoinette and Coleman signed Cartel film rights over to Cash Money Content in 2012. Coleman also signed deals with Warner Bros and NBC Universal for television development.

Personal life
Their son Quaye was born in 2010. In 2011, they were living in Manhattan, New York City; by 2015, the family lived in a four-bedroom home north of Detroit.

Bibliography

Ashley and JaQuavis

JaQuavis Coleman

Ashley Antoinette

References

21st-century American writers
Living people
Writers from Flint, Michigan
Urban fiction
African-American novelists
Writing duos
Married couples
Year of birth missing (living people)